La Chapelle-Anthenaise is a commune in the Mayenne department in north-western France.

Demographic evolution

References

See also
Communes of the Mayenne department

Chapelleanthenaise